Bascuñana is a municipality and town located in the province of Burgos, Castile and León, Spain. According to the 2004 census (INE), the municipality has a population of 61 inhabitants.

The municipality of Bascuñana is made up of two towns: Bascuñana (seat or capital) and San Pedro del Monte.

References 

Municipalities in the Province of Burgos